Keep On Ridin is the third compilation album by the rap group Tha Dogg Pound. The album was released on May 18, 2010, by Gangsta Advisory Records.

Track listing
"We da West" (featuring Snoop Dogg, Bad Lucc, Damani, Problem & Soopafly) — 6:26
"Keep On Ridin" (featuring Butch Cassidy) — 4:28
"Fire" — 3:07
"If U Want Me 2 Stay" (featuring Snoop Dogg & Uncle Chucc) — 4:35
"Stay'd Out All Nite Long" (featuring Uncle Reo) — 3:24
"Real Wit'cha" (featuring Scar & Problem) — 6:47
"Leave a Message" — 3:31
"Bang Dat" (featuring Snoop Dogg) — 3:25
"My CoopDeville" — 4:30
"Huh What" — 4:43
"All Nite" — 3:12
"Don't Give a Fucc" (featuring Snoop Dogg) — 4:31
"Blessin'" (Bonus Track) — 3:04
"I Wanna Rock (G-Mix)" (Bonus Track) (featuring Snoop Dogg) — 3:52

References

Tha Dogg Pound albums
Albums produced by Daz Dillinger
Hip hop compilation albums
2010 compilation albums